Boundary Island may refer to:

Boundary Island (Hainan)
Boundary Island (Western Australia)

See also
Boundary Islet straddles the border of the Australian states of Victoria and Tasmania